Nancy Rourke is an internationally known Deaf artist and ARTivist, with a focus in oil painting. Her pieces carry the themes of resistance, affirmation, and liberation, with stylings falling under 'Rourkeism' and 'Surdism'.

Life 
Rourke grew up in San Diego with both her parents. Her mother was from Michigan, and her father belonged to the Mesa Grande Band of Mission Indians in the Kumeyaay Nation. The family only learned she was deaf at six years old, and she credits her main form of expression before and then after this discovery was art. Her schooling focused on oralism, and Rourke was not educated in ASL until college at the Rochester Institute of Technology. She received a BFA in Graphic Design and Painting (1982) and a MFA in Computer Graphics and Painting (1986). Two of her greatest inspirations were Jean Michel Basquiat and Jacob Lawrence and their work in the civil rights movement.

Career 
Rourke's career began with a variety of graphic design jobs, at companies such as Xerox, 20th Century Fox, and Microsoft. After 2009 she became a full time artist with a focus on Deaf View/Image Art after she began to explore deaf culture. She additionally works to bring Deaf View curriculum into schools for deaf children. She hosts retreats, galleries, and works through several artist-in-residencies in schools nationwide. Some of her experience also pertains to assisting deaf inmates who did not have access to interpreters or video phones in prison, and creating programs to expand their artistic abilities.

In 2014, she published "Nancy Rourke: Deaf Artist Series."

In 2019, she has been awarded the Laurent Clerc Award by Gallaudet University's Alumni Association to recognize a deaf person for "his or her outstanding contributions to society."

References

External links 
 Talking about Art with Nancy Rourke
 Nancy's conversation on De’VIA, and the Deaf perspective in art
 Gallery of Rourke's paintings

Living people
21st-century American women artists
Artists from San Diego
Deaf artists
Rochester Institute of Technology alumni
Year of birth missing (living people)